Jan Antonín Duchoslav (born 1 May 1965, Prague) is a Czech actor.

Filmography
 1982 – Sněženky a machři
 1983 – Už mu to začalo, Sladké starosti
 1984 – Láska z pasáže, Malý vodní had, Třetí patro
 Non plus Ultras
 2006 – Rafťáci
 2009 - 2Bobule

External links
 

1965 births
Living people
Czech male film actors
Czech male television actors
Male actors from Prague
20th-century Czech male actors
21st-century Czech male actors